Trinidad (Spanish for Trinity) is a district in the Itapúa Department of Paraguay.  It is well known for its Jesuit Mission, La Misión de la Santísima Trinidad de Paraná. In 1993, the mission was declared a UNESCO World Heritage Site, and is open to visitation by tourists.

Location
Trinidad is located on Ruta 6ta, 30 kilometers north of the department's capital, Encarnación.  It is surrounded by the following districts:

Jesus and Hohenau to the north,
Nueva Alborada and Hohenau to the east,
Nueva Alborada  and Capitán Miranda to the south,
Capitán Miranda to the west.

Population
According to the 2002 census, by the Dirección General de Estadísticas, Encuestas y Censos, the district had a total of 6,873 inhabitants.  35% (2,417) percent living in the center of the district, and 65% (4,456 ) in rural areas.

Sources 
World Gazeteer: Paraguay – World-Gazetteer.com

Districts of Itapúa Department